Roquebrune may refer to the following communes in France:

 Roquebrune, Gers, in the Gers département
 Roquebrune, Gironde, in the Gironde département 
 Roquebrune, the former name for Roquebrune-Cap Martin, in the Alpes-Maritimes département
 Roquebrune-sur-Argens, in the Var département

Other uses
 13701 Roquebrune, an asteroid